The West Indies women's cricket team toured India in October and November 1976. They played India in a six Test match series, which ended as a 1–1 draw. The matches were the first ever played by the India women's team.

Squads

Test Series

1st Test

2nd Test

3rd Test

4th Test

5th Test

6th Test

References

External links
West Indies Women tour of India 1976/77 from Cricinfo

Women's international cricket tours of India
West Indies women's cricket team tours
1976 in West Indian cricket